Senator Gillespie may refer to:

Ann Gillespie (politician) (fl. 2010s–2020s), Illinois State Senate
James Gillespie (politician) (1747–1805), North Carolina State Senate
Jerry Gillespie (politician) (1950–2011), Arizona State Senate
Joseph Gillespie (1809–1885), Illinois State Senate